(born 8 January 1989 in Itami, Hyōgo, Japan) is a Japanese footballer who currently plays for Nara Club.

Club career
Product of Cerezo Osaka U-15, and winning the Japanese national high school championship as the striker of the team with Takashi Inui up front, Kohei Yamada left Osaka University of Economics during his sophomore season to begin his career with Thespa Kusatsu in Japan's J. League 2. He made his official debut with the club during the 2010 season and ended his first professional season appearing in 18 league matches.

After two seasons with Thespa Kusatsu, Yamada was scouted at the Japan Pro-Footballers Association (JPFA) Tryout by Major League Soccer, and invited to the Major League Soccer combine in January 2012, with a hope of being selected by one of Major league Soccer's nineteen clubs. He was selected by Colorado Rapids in the third round of the 2012 MLS Supplemental Draft (52nd overall). Yamada had signed with MLS before the draft, so became part of the Rapids squad immediately.

Yamada was waived by Colorado on 20 June 2012.

Club statistics
Updated to 23 February 2018.

References

External links
Profile at FC Gifu
Profile at Nagano Parceiro

1989 births
Living people
AC Nagano Parceiro players
Association football midfielders
Association football people from Hyōgo Prefecture
Colorado Rapids draft picks
Colorado Rapids players
Expatriate soccer players in the United States
J2 League players
J3 League players
Japan Football League players
Japanese expatriate sportspeople in the United States
Japanese footballers
Osaka University of Economics alumni
Thespakusatsu Gunma players
V-Varen Nagasaki players
FC Gifu players
Nara Club players